Gair Glacier is a tributary glacier,  long, rising close southeast of Mount Supernal in the Mountaineer Range and flowing east-northeast to enter Mariner Glacier just north of Bunker Bluff in Victoria Land, Antarctica. It was named by the New Zealand Geological Survey Antarctic Expedition (NZGSAE) 1962–63, for geologist H.S. Gair, leader that season of the NZGSAE northern field party.

See also
 List of glaciers in the Antarctic
 Glaciology

References

Glaciers of Borchgrevink Coast